Günter Seibold (December 11, 1936 – June 20, 2013) was a German football player. He spent 6 seasons in the Bundesliga with VfB Stuttgart.

Honours
 DFB-Pokal winner: 1958.

References

External links
 

1936 births
2013 deaths
German footballers
VfB Stuttgart players
Bundesliga players
Association football defenders